Peperomia inaequalifolia is a species of plant in the genus Peperomia. Its native range covers Colombia and Peru.

References

inaequalifolia
Flora of Peru
Flora of Colombia
Plants described in 1798
Taxa named by Hipólito Ruiz López
Taxa named by José Antonio Pavón Jiménez
Medicinal plants of South America